# Zero with a Bullet is the eighth album by American folk rock musician David Dondero, released on August 3, 2010 by Team Love Records. It came three years after his second release with Team Love, Simple Love.

Track listing
 Jesus From 12 To 6 – 3:52
 Caught The Song – 2:27
 Just A Baby in Your Momma's Eyes – 3:48
 Number Zero with a Bullet – 3:59
 It's Peaceful Here – 6:02
 Carolina Moon – 3:20
 Wherever You Go – 5:55
 Don't Be Eyeballin' My Po'Boy, Boy – 4:25
 Job Boss – 3:25
 All These Fishies Swimmin' Through My Head – 4:19

References

External links
 # Zero with a Bullet at Team Love

2010 albums
David Dondero albums
Team Love Records albums